Pedro Farreras Valenti (4 April 1916 – 17 May 1968) was a Spanish field hockey player. He competed in the men's tournament at the 1948 Summer Olympics.

References

External links
 

1916 births
1968 deaths
Spanish male field hockey players
Olympic field hockey players of Spain
Field hockey players at the 1948 Summer Olympics
Field hockey players from Barcelona
Real Club de Polo de Barcelona players